Clawfist - The Peel Sessions  is a split EP recorded by John Peel at BBC's studios, released in November 20, 1992 through Strange Fruit Records. The first half contains Gallon Drunk's session, recorded on July 14, 1991; the second half contains Breed's session, recorded July 28, 1991.

Track listing

Personnel 
Breed
Simon Breed – vocals, guitar
Steve Hewitt – drums
Andrew Park – drums
Gallon Drunk
Joe Byfield – maracas
Max Décharné – drums
Mike Delanian – bass guitar
James Johnston – vocals, guitar, organ
Production and additional personnel
Mike Engles – engineering
Dale Griffin – production
Dave McCarthy – engineering

References

External links 
 

1992 EPs
Gallon Drunk albums
Live EPs
Peel Sessions recordings
Strange Fruit Records EPs